Astu: So Be It (or simply Astu) is a 2015 Indian Marathi-language film directed by the duo Sumitra Bhave and Sunil Suktankar, starring Mohan Agashe, Iravati Harshe, Milind Soman, and Amruta Subhash. The film tells the story of Chakrapani Shastri, a Sanskrit scholar who suffers from Alzheimer's disease.

Plot
Dr. Chakrapani Shastri, fondly known as Appa, is a retired Sanskrit professor and a former director of the Oriental Research Institute in Pune. Shastri currently lives with Ram, a young student, as his caretaker, and has been diagnosed with advanced Alzheimer's disease. One day, as Ram has to appear for his exams, Shastri's elder daughter Ira brings Shastri to her house. While driving back home, Ira stops at a shop, requesting Shastri to stay in the car. Shastri sees a passing elephant on the road. He becomes fascinated and with some help, gets himself out of the car and starts following the elephant through the lanes of the city. When Ira comes back and finds her father gone, she and her husband, Madhav, begin searching for him and report him missing.

As Shastri keeps following Laxmi the elephant, her mahout, Anta, tries to get Shastri to go home. However, Shastri does not remember anything and reaches the mahout's house, where he meets the man's wife, Channamma. She takes care of Shastri along with her newborn. Ira informs her sister Devika of their father's disappearance, but the latter blames Ira and suggests an old-age home for their father. The police trace the elephant's whereabouts and find Shastri, but accuse the mahout of kidnapping the old man. Shastri refuses to go back to Ira, wanting to stay with Channamma. Finally, they manage to convince the senior scholar to return home.

Cast and characters
 Mohan Agashe as Dr. Chakrapani Shastri
 Iravati Harshe as Ira, Shastri's older daughter
 Amruta Subhash as Channamma
 Milind Soman as Madhav, Ira's husband
 Devika Daftardar as Rahi, Shastri's younger daughter
 Jyoti Subhash as Malti Kaku
 Nachiket Purnapatre as Anta, mahout

Production
Actor Mohan Agashe was approached with the idea of a short film that deals with Alzheimer's disease. Though he liked the project, he wasn't satisfied with the script and suggested improving it. He invited Sumitra Bhave to meet with the filmmaker, and she ended up turning it into a feature-length production. After shooting was completed, one of the co-producers backed out of post-production. Agashe contributed from his pension to complete the remaining work.

Release and reception
Though the film was completed in 2013, it did not find a distributor and was released through crowdfunding in 2016.
 It was originally released in Pune in 2014 and later re-released to qualify for the Maharashtra state film subsidy, which requires the film to be released in ten state districts. It was also screened at the New York Film Festival (NYFF) and a special screening was organised at the Harvard University campus to raise awareness of problems suffered by the elderly due to lack of human interaction. A panel discussion was also held, with the participation of Mohan Agashe and professors Arthur Kleinman and Diana L. Eck.

The film was praised for its depiction of Alzheimer's disease and dementia, as well as the performances of the lead actors. Namrata Joshi of The Hindu wrote that, "though the film is about loss of memory, it's structured and built around a series of recollections" and mentioned that the film builds awareness of Alzheimer's disease but "does not slip into sermonizing, it remains sensitive, not sentimental". Mihir Bhanage of The Times of India wrote that the "splendid narration and direction, coupled with excellent performances, are a high point of this film".

Awards
The film won several awards upon release.

References

External links
 

2013 films
Films directed by Sumitra Bhave–Sunil Sukthankar
Films featuring a Best Supporting Actress National Film Award-winning performance
Films whose writer won the Best Dialogue National Film Award
2010s Marathi-language films